

Consensus usually refers to general agreement among the members of a group or community. It may also refer to:

Sociology
 Consensus decision-making, the process of making decisions using consensus.
 Rough consensus, a term used in consensus decision-making to indicate the "sense of the group" concerning a matter under consideration.
 Consensus democracy, democracy where consensus decision-making is used to create, amend or repeal legislation.
 Consensus-based assessment, the use of consensus to produce methods of evaluating information.

Philosophy
 Consensus reality, reality as defined by consensus, particularly popular consensus, rather than or before other (philosophical) criteria.
 Consensus theory of truth, truth as determined by consensus rather than or before other criteria.

Psychology
 False-consensus effect, a tendency to overestimate the extent to which beliefs or opinions match those of others.

Science and technology
 Scientific consensus
 Consensus (computer science), techniques to provide coherence among and between nodes of a distributed computer system or database.
 Consensus sequence, the order of nucleotide or amino acid residues most frequently found within a DNA, RNA or protein sequence.
 Consensus theorem, an identity in Boolean algebra.
 Consensus or resolvent term, defined in the consensus theorem.

Professional
 Scientific consensus, the collective opinion, judgment and position of scientists as regards matters of fact, especially with reference to a particular scientific or science-related issue.
 Medical consensus, a public statement of what is taken to be the consensus among medical experts as regards an aspect or aspects of medical knowledge.

Political
 1992 Consensus, used to refer to the outcome of a meeting held in 1992 between semi-official representatives of the People's Republic of China (PRC) and the Republic of China (ROC).

Policy
 Copenhagen Consensus, a think tank-like project that uses welfare economics and cost–benefit analysis to recommend priorities and investment in global welfare.
 Monterrey Consensus, the outcome of the United Nations International Conference on Financing for Development held in Monterrey, Mexico, in 2002.
 Washington Consensus, an informal name for a set of economic policies commonly prescribed by institutions based in Washington D.C. such as the International Monetary Fund (IMF) and World Bank.

See also
 Consensus conference (disambiguation)
 Consensual nonconsent